Tyler Colon, known professionally as Tai Verdes, is an American singer-songwriter. He grew up in California; he played guitar, piano, and ukulele. Playing on the basketball team during his attendance at Babson College, he maintained his love for music and eventually dropped out. He was also featured on season 6 of “Are You the One”. He worked at a phone store during the coronavirus outbreak, but this still helped further his musical passion and during the same time, he released his breakout single "Stuck in the Middle" in August 2020. The song went viral on TikTok. He responded to his newfound success saying the song "doesn't just turn into a million dollars and a nice car. It turns into waiting-which I think I've gotten pretty good at."

In May 2021, he released his debut full-length studio album, TV. The album featured the single "A-O-K", which peaked at No. 34 on the Billboard Hot 100 and achieved 24.7 million radio plays.

Career
Tai released his first single "Stuck In the Middle" in mid-2020, which picked up millions of views on multiple streaming services. At the time he was sleeping on a friend's couch and working at a Verizon phone service store. Before then he auditioned for shows including The Voice and American Idol, but to no avail. However, he won an MTV dating series when he starred on Season 6 of Are You the One?.

"Stuck in the Middle" went viral on TikTok. This success carried to other singles such as "Sheesh!" and "Drugs".

In January 2022, Tai signed a global publishing deal with Kobalt Music Group, citing "artist-friendly" contract terms. He had previously signed with Arista, a record label owned by Sony Music.

Discography

Studio albums

Singles

Notes

References 

American male singer-songwriters
Living people
Musicians from California
Arista Records artists
1995 births